The Department of Commerce Silver Medal is the second highest of three honor awards of the United States Department of Commerce.  Since 1949, the Silver Medal is presented by the Secretary of Commerce for exceptional service. The award may be presented to an individual, group, or organization in the Commerce Department for noteworthy or superlative contributions which have a direct and lasting impact with the department.

The annual Department of Commerce Gold and Silver Medal Awards ceremony is held each fall at the Ronald Reagan Amphitheater in Washington, D.C. An individual and members of a group which is awarded the Silver Medal Award are each presented a framed certificate signed by the Secretary and medal. An organization receiving the award is presented one framed certificate signed by the Secretary and medal.

Award criteria 
The Silver Medal Award is awarded for exceptional performance characterized by noteworthy or superlative contributions, which have a direct and lasting impact with the Department of Commerce.

To warrant a Silver Medal, a contribution must focus on qualitative and quantitative performance measures reflected in the Department of Commerce's strategic plan and be identified in one of the following areas:
 Leadership
 Personal and professional excellence
 Scientific/engineering achievement
 Organizational development
 Customer service
 Administrative/technical support or
 Heroism

NOAA Corps recipients 
The National Oceanic and Atmospheric Administration Commissioned Officer Corps (NOAA Corps) is eligible to send an overall total of 20 Gold and Silver nominations to the Department of Commerce per year.

The Silver Medal is awarded to an individual, group, or Commerce organization for extraordinary achievements in support of the critical objectives of the Department of Commerce with a significant beneficial effect on the Nation or world.

To warrant the award of the Silver Medal, a contribution must meet at least one of the following criteria:
 Achievement of important program goals, marked by excellence of performance and quality of results exceeding expectations;
 Scientific leadership or management resulting in substantial improvements in productivity, program effectiveness, or quality of the Department's service;
 Scientific technological contributions that significantly advance the understanding, knowledge, or mastery of a given discipline;
 Exceptional meritorious authorship or editorship that contributes significantly to the body of knowledge in a given field; or
 Unusual courage or competence in an emergency.

The NOAA awardees of the Silver Medal Award are presented a medallion by the Department of Commerce and NOAA Commissioned Corps awardees are presented a full sized military style medal, miniature medal, and a full and miniature size service ribbon provided from the Commissioned Personnel Center. Group or organizational recipients of the Silver Medal are authorized to wear a silver  inch "O" device on the full size medal's suspension ribbon and service ribbon. Each additional award of the Silver Medal is denoted by a  inch gold star for the full size medal suspension ribbon and service ribbon and a  inch gold star for the miniature medal suspension ribbon.

Individual and group members also receive a framed certificate signed by the Secretary of Commerce. Members of an organization awarded the Silver Medal each receive the award and the organization receives one framed certificate signed by the Secretary of Commerce to represent the entire organization.

Notable recipients
Anita L. Lopez
Michael J. Silah
Nancy Hann
William L. Stubblefield
Kelly E. Taggart
NOAAS Heck (S 591)
NOAAS Rude (S 590) (two awards)

References

Awards and decorations of the United States Department of Commerce